David Russo may refer to:

David C. Russo (born 1953), member of the New Jersey General Assembly
David Russo, American guitarist from Sun-60
David Russo, a pseudonym for John D'Agostino in the book Rigged